Feyder is a surname. Notable people with the surname include:

Alphonse Feyder (1916–1985), Luxembourgish footballer
Jacques Feyder (1885–1948), Belgian actor, screenwriter, and film director
Otto Feyder (1877–1961), American gymnast
Patrick Feyder (born 1971), Luxembourgish footballer
Vera Feyder (born 1939), Belgian writer